Enamovirus is a genus of viruses, in the family Solemoviridae. Plants serve as natural hosts. There are five species in this genus. Diseases associated with this genus include: pea enation disease: if both PEMV-1 and PEMV-2 are present.

Taxonomy
The following species are recognized:
Alfalfa enamovirus 1
Birdsfoot trefoil enamovirus 1
Citrus vein enation virus
Grapevine enamovirus 1
Pea enation mosaic virus 1

Structure
Viruses in Enamovirus are non-enveloped, with icosahedral and  Spherical geometries, and T=3 symmetry. The diameter is around 25 nm. Genomes are linear and non-segmented, around 5.7kb in length.

Life cycle
Viral replication is cytoplasmic. Entry into the host cell is achieved by penetration into the host cell. Replication follows the positive stranded RNA virus replication model. Positive stranded RNA virus transcription is the method of transcription. Translation takes place by leaky scanning, -1 ribosomal frameshifting, and  suppression of termination. The virus exits the host cell by tubule-guided viral movement. Plants serve as the natural host. The virus is transmitted via a vector (insects). Transmission routes are vector and mechanical.

References

External links
 Viralzone: Enamovirus
 ICTV

Virus genera